Swain Destinations is a customized and experiential travel company, founded in 1987.

History 
Swain Destinations was founded by Ian and Linda Swain in 1987 as Swain Tours. The company first began selling outbound travel from the United States to Australia and New Zealand. Ian, a native Australian with his American wife Linda could see a need for sound advice for Americans to visit Ian's homeland.

It was then Ian extended the destinations to include South East Asia and Southern and Eastern Africa. In 1997, Africa and Asia were added to their travel product. Swain Tours focuses heavily on exotic destinations around the world. Swain Tours began to brand their signature style as customized travel, as opposed to escorted touring.

Ian Swain sold Swain Tours to Far & Wide Travel in 1999, and continued to run it as part of management of Far & Wide. Swain Tours remained profitable during this four-year relationship. Far & Wide filed for bankruptcy in September 2003. During this time, Ian Swain was in negotiations to buy back Swain Tours, but was outbid by Travel Corp. for the sum of $3 million. In 2006, Ian Swain bought Swain Tours from Travel Corp for an undisclosed amount. Swain Tours has been family owned and operated since.

In January 2014, Swain Tours relaunched as Swain Destinations to emphasize independent and customized travel.

Awards
South Australian Tourism Commission, Tour Wholesaler of the Year 2009, 2012

References

Further reading 
 
 
 
 
 
 
 
 
 

Travel and holiday companies of the United States
Companies based in Ardmore, Pennsylvania